Steve Gainer, ASC ASK (born October 25, 1962) is an American cinematographer, director, and producer. He is a member and museum curator of the American Society of Cinematographers, a member of the Directors Guild of America, and the Academy of Motion Picture Arts and Sciences.

His credits include: With Love (TV series), Life By Ella (TV series), On My Block (TV series), Puppy Place (TV series), Schooled (TV series), The Last Laugh (2019 film), Mayhem (film), American Girl, Sweet/Vicious, Everly, Awkward, Catch Hell, Super, Punisher: War Zone, Black Cloud, Mysterious Skin, Bully, Dirty Girl, Movie 43, and A Haunted House. From 1991 to 1994 he was the manager of the Paramount Pictures Corporation film lab. While at the Paramount lab, Gainer met future director Dave Meyers. With Dave Meyers Gainer shot over thirty music videos and the feature film Foolish.  Since 1994, he has been director of photography on dozens of films, commercials, and music videos. 
In 2000 Gainer teamed with Larry Clark on the Indie film Bully (2001 film) In 2013 and 2015, he also directed episodes of the MTV comedy-drama series Awkward, and in 2014 won a Daytime Emmy for a PSA based on that series.  In 2018 he was nominated for a Daytime Emmy for the Amazon movie | An American Girl Story – Ivy & Julie 1976: A Happy Balance

Gainer and his wife, Karen, were married on January 22, 2000. The couple have two children Sebastian and Lexi.

References

External links

1962 births
Living people
American cinematographers
People from Alexandria, Louisiana
People from Los Angeles
People from Prattville, Alabama